Deh Naseh-ye Mazkur Gelal (also Romanized as Deh Naseh-ye Maẕkūr Gelāl) is a village in Chin Rural District, Ludab District, Boyer-Ahmad County, Kohgiluyeh and Boyer-Ahmad Province, Iran. At the 2006 census, its population was 20, in 4 families.

References 

Populated places in Boyer-Ahmad County